The eighth season of the American animated television series The Simpsons originally aired on the Fox network between October 27, 1996, and May 18, 1997, beginning with "Treehouse of Horror VII". The showrunners for the eighth production season were Bill Oakley and Josh Weinstein, while the season was produced by Gracie Films and 20th Century Fox Television. The aired season contained two episodes that were hold-over episodes from season seven, which Oakley and Weinstein also ran. It also contained two episodes for which Al Jean and Mike Reiss were the show runners.

The DVD box set was released in Region 1 on August 15, 2006, Region 2 on October 2, 2006, and Region 4 on September 27, 2006. The set was released in two different forms: a Maggie-shaped head to match the Homer and Marge shaped heads of the previous two sets and also a standard rectangular shaped box. Like the seventh season box set, both versions are available for sale separately.

Voice cast & characters

Main cast
 Dan Castellaneta as Homer Simpson, Grampa Simpson, Krusty the Clown, Groundskeeper Willie, Barney Gumble, Santa's Little Helper, and various others
 Julie Kavner as Marge Simpson, Patty Bouvier, Selma Bouvier and various others
 Nancy Cartwright as Bart Simpson, Nelson Muntz, Ralph Wiggum and various others
 Yeardley Smith as Lisa Simpson
 Harry Shearer as Mr. Burns, Waylon Smithers, Ned Flanders, Principal Skinner, Lenny Leonard, Kent Brockman, Reverend Lovejoy, and various others
 Hank Azaria as Moe Szyslak, Chief Wiggum, Professor Frink, Comic Book Guy, Apu, Bumblebee Man and various others

Recurring
 Pamela Hayden as Milhouse van Houten, Jimbo Jones
 Maggie Roswell as Maude Flanders, Helen Lovejoy and Miss Hoover
 Russi Taylor as Martin Prince and Sherri and Terri
 Tress MacNeille as Agnes Skinner
 Marcia Wallace as Edna Krabappel
 Frank Welker as Laddie, The Baboons, various animals

Guest stars

 Phil Hartman as Bill Clinton, Troy McClure, and Lionel Hutz (various episodes)
 Joe Mantegna as Fat Tony ("The Twisted World of Marge Simpson", "Homer vs. the Eighteenth Amendment")
 Albert Brooks (credited as A. Brooks) as Hank Scorpio ("You Only Move Twice")
 Sally Stevens as 'Scorpio' Singer (uncredited; "You Only Move Twice")
 Paul Winfield as Lucius Sweet("The Homer They Fall")
 Michael Buffer as himself ("The Homer They Fall")
 Rodney Dangerfield as Larry Burns ("Burns, Baby Burns")
 Jon Lovitz as Jay Sherman ("Hurricane Neddy")
 Johnny Cash as the Space Coyote ("The Mysterious Voyage of Homer")
 Leonard Nimoy as himself("The Springfield Files")
 Gillian Anderson as Dana Scully("The Springfield Files")
 David Duchovny as Fox Mulder ("The Springfield Files")
 Jack Lemmon as Frank Ormand ("The Twisted World of Marge Simpson")
 Maggie Roswell as Shary Bobbins ("Simpsoncalifragilisticexpiala(Annoyed Grunt)cious")
 Alex Rocco as Roger Meyers, Jr("The Itchy & Scratchy & Poochie Show")
 John Waters as John ("Homer's Phobia")
 Kelsey Grammer as Sideshow Bob("Brother from Another Series")
 David Hyde Pierce as Cecil Terwilliger and "Man in crowd"("Brother from Another Series")
 Dave Thomas as Rex Banner("Homer vs. The Eighteenth Amendment")
 Bret Hart as himself ("The Old Man and the Lisa")
 Sab Shimono as Mr. Sparkle ("In Marge We Trust")
 Gedde Watanabe as the Factory worker ("In Marge We Trust")
 Karen Maruyama and Denice Kumagai as dancers ("In Marge We Trust")
 Tim Conway as himself ("The Simpsons Spin-Off Showcase")
 Gailard Sartain as Charles "Big" Daddy ("The Simpsons Spin-Off Showcase")
 Willem Dafoe as the Commandant ("The Secret War of Lisa Simpson")

Reception

Season eight received critical acclaim and won multiple awards, including two Emmy Awards: "Homer's Phobia" won for Outstanding Animated Program (for Programming One Hour or Less) in 1997, and Alf Clausen and Ken Keeler won for "Outstanding Individual Achievement in Music and Lyrics" with the song "We Put the Spring in Springfield" from the episode "Bart After Dark". Clausen also received an Emmy nomination for "Outstanding Music Direction" for "Simpsoncalifragilisticexpiala(Annoyed Grunt)cious". "Brother from Another Series" was nominated for the Emmy for "Sound Mixing For a Comedy Series or a Special". For "Homer's Phobia", Mike Anderson won the Annie Award for Best Individual Achievement: Directing in a TV Production, and the WAC Winner Best Director for Primetime Series at the 1998 World Animation Celebration. Gay & Lesbian Alliance Against Defamation awarded the episode the GLAAD Media Award for "Outstanding TV – Individual Episode".  On Rotten Tomatoes, the eighth season of The Simpsons has a 100% approval rating based on 7 critical  reviews.

Episodes

Home media

The DVD box set for season eight was released by 20th Century Fox in the United States and Canada on August 15, 2006, nine years after it had completed broadcast on television. As well as every episode from the season, the DVD release features bonus material including deleted scenes, Animatics, and commentaries for every episode. As with the previous season, the set was released in two different packagings: a "Collector's Edition" plastic packaging molded to look like Maggie's head, and a standard rectangular cardboard box featuring Maggie looking through a photo album while the rest of the Simpsons family are taking a picture. The menus continue the same format from the previous three seasons, and the overall theme is various characters posing for photographs.

See also

 List of The Simpsons episodes

References

Bibliography

Notes

External links

 Season 8 at The Simpsons.com
 Season 8 at the BBC

Simpsons season 08
1996 American television seasons
1997 American television seasons